Gadu-Gadu (Polish for "chit-chat"; commonly known as GG or gg) is a Polish instant messaging client using a proprietary protocol. Gadu-Gadu was the most popular IM service in Poland, with over 15 million registered accounts and approximately 6.5 million users online daily. Gadu-Gadu's casual gaming portal had some 500,000 active users at the end of March 2009. Users send up to 300 million messages per day.

Gadu-Gadu is financed by the display of advertisements. The developer is based in Warsaw, Poland and the company is wholly owned by a Polish company England.pl.

Features 

Gadu-Gadu uses its own proprietary protocol. As with ICQ, users are identified by unique serial numbers. Protocol's features include status messages, file sharing, and VoIP. Users may format and embed images in messages. Since client version 6.0, an experimental secure connection mode can be used.

The official client provides over 150 emoticons, allows grouping contacts, sending SMS and integrates with other services ran by the same company: a virtual Internet dial-up, a social networking site MojaGeneracja.pl (defunct since 5 November 2012) and an internet radio Open.fm.

Gadu-Gadu allows its users to add personal information to a publicly searchable directory. Language options include English and Polish. There is also a browser version available.

Blip.pl 
Blip.pl (or just Blip) was a Polish social networking internet service, founded in May 2007 and currently owned by Gadu-Gadu. It had microblogging capability. Soon after being established, it was purchased by Gadu-Gadu S.A in June 2007.

About 329,000 people visited the site in June 2009. In October 2009 the number of posts on the network exceeded ten million. By 4 December 2010 the service had 80,000 users. Notable Polish celebrities and politicians, such as Lech Wałęsa and Grzegorz Napieralski, used the site. The service was used as a communication channel of various governmental services, for example ZUS.

Blip was closed on 2 September 2013, following a two-month advance notice. During this period, users could choose to migrate their accounts to Wykop, which hosts a similar microblogging service.

See also 

 Comparison of instant messaging clients
 Comparison of instant messaging protocols

References

External links 
  

Instant messaging clients
Symbian instant messaging clients
Internet in Poland
Software that uses Qt
Windows instant messaging clients
Polish brands
2000 software